For the American former football wide receiver, see Stacey Simmons (American football).

Stacey Jodi Simmons (born 2 September 1972) is a former Bermudian woman cricketer. She represented Bermuda at the 2008 Women's Cricket World Cup Qualifier.

References 

1972 births
Living people
Bermudian women cricketers